The women's 10,000 metres event at the 1990 Commonwealth Games was held on 2 February at the Mount Smart Stadium in Auckland.

Results

References

10000
1990
1990 in women's athletics